Eyre Bus Service and Eyre Tour & Travel, Ltd. provides bus and tour services in the United States Mid-Atlantic states from its base in central Maryland.  It is also a contract operator for commuter transit in Hagerstown, Maryland, and Frederick, Maryland.

The company's CEO and Chairman is Ronald L. Eyre, and its President is Matt Eyre.  As of December 2015, it had a fleet of 50 buses, and operated five contract routes for MTA Maryland:  MTA Routes 202, 203, 204, and 205 operating on the Intercounty Connector, and Route 515 operating from Frederick, Maryland to Shady Grove Metro Station.

References

External links
 Eyre Bus, Tour & Travel

Intercity bus companies of the United States
Companies based in Maryland
Transport companies established in 1947
1947 establishments in Maryland
Transportation in Howard County, Maryland
Transportation companies based in Maryland